The following is a list of daily news podcasts, organized by type (original podcast or adapted media) and then by country. It represents a small subset of news podcasts that release an episode every day, sometimes with the exception of weekends or holidays.

Original podcasts

Australia

Brazil

Canada

Germany

New Zealand

United Kingdom

United States

Adapted radio and television shows

References 

Lists of podcasts
Journalism lists